Mount Geikie, pronounced like "geeky", is a  mountain summit located in Mount Robson Provincial Park in British Columbia, Canada. Mount Geikie is composed of quartzite of the Cambrian period. This rock was pushed east and over the top of younger rock during the Laramide orogeny.

History

Mount Geikie was named in 1898 by J. E. McEvoy of the Geological Survey of Canada for Scottish geologist Sir Archibald Geikie (1835–1924), who was the director-general of the British Geological Survey from 1882 to 1901. The mountain was labelled on Arthur O. Wheeler's 1911 topographic map of the Mount Robson area. The mountain's name was officially adopted in 1951 when approved by the Geographical Names Board of Canada.

Climbing
The first ascent of Mount Geikie was made in 1924 by Val Fynn, M.D. Geddes, and Cyril G. Wates via a southwest route. The first ascent of the north face was accomplished in 1967 by John Hudson and Royal Robbins. Other routes on the north face include the Lowe/Hannibal in 1979 by George Lowe and Dean Hannibal, Hesse-Shilling (5.10) by Mark Hesse and Brad Shilling in August 1994, and Honky Tonquin (VI+ 5.10 A3) by Seth Shaw and Scott Simper in July 1999. The first solo ascent of the north face was made in August 2017 by Tony McLane of Canada. The normal climbing route is the Southeast Face (IV, 5.5).

Climate
Based on the Köppen climate classification, Mount Geikie is located in a subarctic climate zone with cold, snowy winters, and mild summers. Winter temperatures can drop below -20 °C with wind chill factors below -30 °C. The months July and August offer the most favorable weather months for climbing. However, these months coincide with mosquito season, which requires effective defenses for the days-long approach to reach the mountain. Precipitation runoff from Mount Geikie drains into Geikie Creek and Tonquin Creek, both tributaries and headwaters of the Fraser River.

See also

 Geography of British Columbia

References

External links
 Mount Geikie and The Ramparts aerial photo: PBase
 Ansel Adams' Mount Geikie photo: Flickr
 Provincial Park web site: Mount Robson Provincial Park
 Weather: Mount Geikie
 Pronunciation: Cambridge Dictionary

Three-thousanders of British Columbia
Canadian Rockies
Cariboo Land District
Mount Robson Provincial Park